Florrie's Dragons is a children's animated series that was produced by Wish Films and Clockwork Zoo and animated by Studio 100 Animation. The series is based on a children's book named Dear Dragon. The series was created by An Vrombaut, the creator known from 64 Zoo Lane, which the series is related to. The series mainly aired on Disney Junior in the United Kingdom.

Premise 
The story of Princess Florrie, and her five dragons, help to solve a problem, and have ideas for and enchantment and modern creativity.

Characters 
 Princess Florrie – The main character of the series. She is a little princess and lives in the castle. She wears a golden crown on her head, brown hair with freckles, fair skin, magenta-and-yellow dress with a pair of magenta shoes.
 Paprika – The baker. She loves to bake stuff. She even bakes for events.
Ferdinand - A king. He loves to be in charge of the castle. He even makes a list for events.
Casimir - A wizard. He loves to do magic. He can make anything from the cauldron.
Rattle – A tiny knight robot who makes rattling sounds everytime he moves.

Dragons 
 Dear Dragon – Florrie's sidekick. He can blow bubbles.
 Toot-Toot – The dragon who can play a trumpet with his nose.
 Splish-Splash – The dragon who likes water and can make "pretty waves".
 Pom & Pom – The twin and cheerleader dragons.
 Zoom-Zoom – The dragon who flies super fast.

Broadcast 
The series was also broadcast on Disney Junior in the United Kingdom, and returned on ITVBe's LittleBe Between 3 September 2018 and 29 August 2021, MiniMini+ in Poland, and KIKA in Germany. The series was dubbed in the Irish language (Gaeilge) by Dublin-based studios Macalla Teoranta for TG4, and is called Dragain Florrie in Irish. A Bangla dubbed version of the series was aired on Duronto TV in Bangladesh.

References

External links
 

2010s British animated television series
2010s British children's television series
2010 British television series debuts
2011 British television series endings
Animated television series about children
Animated television series about dragons
British children's animated adventure television series
British children's animated fantasy television series
British television shows based on children's books
Television series about princesses
British preschool education television series
Animated preschool education television series
2010s preschool education television series
South African animated television series
South African children's television series
English-language television shows
Lost_television_shows